There are several municipalities called Eching in Bavaria, Germany

Eching, Freising, a municipality in Freising district, near Munich
Eching am Ammersee, a municipality in Landsberg district, near Munich
Eching, Landshut, a municipality in Landshut district

See also
 Etching (disambiguation)